Eva March Tappan (December 26, 1854 – January 29, 1930) was a teacher and American author born in Blackstone, Massachusetts, the only child of Reverend Edmund March Tappan and Lucretia Logée. Eva graduated from Vassar College in 1875. She was a member of Phi Beta Kappa and an editor of the Vassar Miscellany. After leaving Vassar she began teaching at Wheaton College where she taught Latin and German from 1875 until 1880. From  1884–94 she was the Associate Principal at the Raymond Academy in Camden, New Jersey. She received graduate degrees in English Literature from the University of Pennsylvania. Tappan was the  head of the English department at the English High School at Worcester, Massachusetts. She began her literary career writing about famous characters in history and developed an interest in writing children books. Tappan never married.

Principal works 

 Adventures & Achievements. 1900
 Poems & Rhymes. 1900 
 In the Days of Alfred the Great. 1900  
 Stories from Seven Old Favourites. 1900 
 In the Days of William the Conqueror. 1901 
 England's story; a history for grammar and high schools. 1901
 In the Days of Queen Elizabeth. 1902
 Robin Hood, : His Book. 1903
 A Short History of England's Literature. 1905
 American Hero Stories. 1906
 A Short History of America's Literature. 1907
 The Out-Of-Door Book. 1907
 The Chaucer Story Book. 1908
 The Story of the Greek People. 1908
 Old World Hero Stories, or European Hero Stories. 1909
 The Story of the Roman People. 1910
 Dixie Kitten. 1910
 An Old, Old Storybook: Compiled from the Old Testament. (Editor) 1910
 When Knights Were Bold. 1911
 An Elementary History of Our Country.  1914
 Heroes of the Middle Ages: Alaric to Columbus. 1914
 The Little Book of the Flag. 1917
 The Little Book of the War.  1918
 Hero Stories of France. 1920
 Heroes of Progress; Stories of Successful Americans. 1921

References

Citations

Bibliography
Yesterday’s Classics, LLC.  Eva March Tappan, The Baldwin Online Children’s Literature Project Accessed September 10, 2008
 Online Books Page, Works by Eva March Tappan Online Books Page Accessed December 14, 2017

External links 

 
 
 
 works by Eva March Tappan biblio.com Accessed September 14, 2008
 Eva March Tappan papers
 Digitized works by Eva March Tappan

1854 births
1930 deaths
Vassar College alumni
University of Pennsylvania alumni
Wheaton College (Massachusetts) faculty
People from Blackstone, Massachusetts